Jacob Dalton Walsh (born July 20, 1995) is an American professional baseball pitcher for the St. Louis Cardinals of Major League Baseball (MLB). He made his MLB debut in 2022.

Amateur career
Walsh attended Melbourne High School, Jacksonville State University, Eastern Florida State College, and Florida Southern College. In 2017, as a junior at Florida Southern, Walsh started 16 games and went 12–1 with a 2.80 ERA over  innings. Following the season's end, he was selected by the St. Louis Cardinals in the 23rd round of the 2017 Major League Baseball draft.

Professional career
Walsh signed with St. Louis and made his professional debut with the Johnson City Cardinals of the Rookie-level Appalachian League, going 5–0 with a 0.95 ERA over  innings. He spent the 2018 season with the Peoria Chiefs of the Class A Midwest League and the Palm Beach Cardinals of the Class A-Advanced Florida State League, appearing in 25 games (24 starts) with both clubs in which he went 9–5 with a 2.51 ERA and 116 strikeouts. Walsh appeared in only two games in 2019 due to injury, and did not play a minor league game in 2020 due to the cancellation of the minor league season caused by the COVID-19 pandemic. In 2021, Walsh missed time due to injury, but still appeared in 17 games with the Springfield Cardinals of the Double-A Central and the Memphis Redbirds of the Triple-A East, going 2–2 with a 2.86 ERA and 34 strikeouts over 22 relief innings. He was selected to play in the Arizona Fall League for the Glendale Desert Dogs after the season.

On November 19, 2021, the Cardinals selected Walsh's contract and added him to their 40-man roster. He returned to Memphis to begin the 2022 season. On May 11, the Cardinals promoted Walsh to the major leagues.

Walsh was optioned to Triple-A Memphis to begin the 2023 season.

References

External links
Florida Southern bio

1995 births
Living people
People from Indialantic, Florida
Baseball players from Florida
Major League Baseball pitchers
St. Louis Cardinals players
Jacksonville State Gamecocks baseball players
Florida Southern Moccasins baseball players
Johnson City Cardinals players
Peoria Chiefs players
Palm Beach Cardinals players
Gulf Coast Cardinals players
Springfield Cardinals players
Memphis Redbirds players
Glendale Desert Dogs players